A number of units of measurement were used in Venezuela to measure quantities like length, mass, etc.  Metric system was optional in Venezuela since 1857, and has been compulsory since 1914.

System before metric system
Older system was Spain (Castilian) System.

Length

Several units were used.  Following of Granada:

1 vara = 0.8 m

1 meile = 6280 vara.

Some other units are:

1 legua = 6280 vara

1 pie =  vara

1 cuarta =  vara

1 pulgada =  vara.

According to an older source, one vara was equal to 0.835 m (32.874 in).

Mass

Several units were used.  Following of Granada:

1 libra = 0.5 kg

1 bag = 62.5 kg.

Some other units are:

1 tonelada = 2000 libra

1 carga = 250 libra

1 Saco = 125 libra

1 Quintal = 100 libra

1 arroba = 25 libra

1 onza =  libra.

According to another older source, one quintal was equal to 46.012 kg (101.438 1 lb).

Capacity

One arroba was equal to 16.137 L.

References

Venezuelan culture
Venezuela